The Chequers is a grade II listed public house in Coopers Lane, Potters Bar, Hertfordshire. It was originally two attached houses built in the late 18th century but has been a public house since around 1840. The buildings were altered and extended in the 19th century.

References

External links

Grade II listed pubs in Hertfordshire
Potters Bar